Henry Winter Syle (November 9, 1846 – January 6, 1890) was the first deaf person to be ordained a priest in the Episcopal Church in the United States.

Henry Winter Syle was born in Shanghai, China; Syle was a student and parishioner of Thomas Gallaudet.  He was deaf from an early age.  He attended Trinity College in Hartford, Connecticut, St. John's College in Cambridge, England, and Yale University in New Haven, Connecticut.  Syle was encouraged to become a priest by Gallaudet.  Ordained on October 14, 1883, he became the first deaf clergyman in the United States.  He established a congregation for the deaf in 1888.

Syle struggled with poor health his whole life.  He died of pneumonia on Jan. 6, 1890, in Philadelphia, Pennsylvania.

He is commemorated along with his teacher, Thomas Gallaudet on August 27 on the Episcopal calendar of saints.

See also

References

External links
Papers and Biographical Sketch of Henry Winter Syle, Gallaudet University archives
 

1846 births
1890 deaths
Alumni of St John's College, Cambridge
American Episcopal priests
Anglican saints
Deaf religious workers
American deaf people
Deaths from pneumonia in Pennsylvania
19th-century American Episcopalians
19th-century American clergy